Ficus glaberrima is an Asian species of fig tree in the family Moraceae.  
The native range of this species is India, S. China and tropical Asia: Indo-China to the Lesser Sunda Islands (but not Borneo, Sulawesi or the Philippines).  The species can be found in Vietnam: where it may be called đa trụi or đa lá xanh.

Subspecies 
Plants of the World Online  lists:
 F. glaberrima subsp. glaberrima
 F. glaberrima subsp. siamensis (Corner) C.C.Berg

Gallery

References

External links 
 
 

glaberrima
Trees of Vietnam
Flora of Indo-China
Flora of Malesia
Plants described in 1825